Erik Fabbri (born 12 August 1991) is an Italian midfielder who plays his football with Ravenna Calcio. He has appeared three times in the Italian Serie C1.

References 
aic.football.it 

1991 births
Living people
Italian footballers
Ravenna F.C. players
Association football midfielders